Good Lovin' is the fifth studio album by Australian singer David Campbell, released in November 2008. It is a collection of songs described by Campbell as 'blue-eyed soul', mostly from the 1960s.

Good Lovin' achieved platinum sales in Australia.

Track listing
Intro
1-2-3
Good Lovin'
You've Lost That Lovin' Feelin' (featuring Jimmy Barnes)
Keep On Running
How Can I Be Sure
Jackie Wilson Said (I'm in Heaven When You Smile)
Tell It Like It Is
You've Made Me So Very Happy
Yeh Yeh
Baby Now That I've Found You
Suspicious Minds
Devil With The Blue Dress

Bonus tracks on re-release (Keep On Lovin')
Saturday In The Park
Since I Don't Have You
Gimme Some Loving
Smoke Gets In Your Eyes
White Christmas

Charts and certifications

Weekly charts

Year-end charts

Certifications

References

2008 albums
Covers albums
David Campbell (Australian musician) albums
Sony Music Australia albums